Abyshevo (Abyšgurt) is a rural locality (a village) in Romashkinskoye Rural Settlement of Alnashsky District, Udmurtia, Russia. The population was 28 as of 2008. There are 2 streets.

Geography 
Abyshevo is located 8 km northeast of Alnashi (the district's administrative centre) by road. Shaytanovo is the nearest rural locality.

References 

Rural localities in Udmurtia